Ch'iyar Jaqhi (Aymara ch'iyara black, jaqhi precipice, cliff, "black cliff", Hispanicized spellings Chearaje, Chiar Jakke, Chiaracce, Chiaraje, Chiaraji, Chiaraque, Chiarjakke, Chiarjaque) may refer to:

Mountains

Bolivia
 Ch'iyar Jaqhi (La Paz), La Paz Department
 Ch'iyar Jaqhi (Pagador), Sebastián Pagador Province, Oruro Department
 Ch'iyar Jaqhi (Potosí), Potosí Department
 Ch'iyar Jaqhi (Sajama), Turco Municipality, Sajama Province, Oruro Department
 Ch'iyar Jaqhi (Turco), Turco Municipality, Sajama Province, Oruro Department
 Ch'iyar Jaqhi (Umurata), near Umurata in the Turco Municipality, Sajama Province, Oruro Department

Peru
 Ch'iyar Jaqhi (Azángaro), Azángaro Province, Puno Region
 Ch'iyar Jaqhi (Cusco), Cusco Region
 Ch'iyar Jaqhi (Moquegua), Mariscal Nieto Province, Moquegua Region
 Ch'iyar Jaqhi (Moquegua-Puno), Moquegua Region and Puno Region
 Chiaracce (Melgar), Melgar Province, Puno Region
 Chiaraje (Cusco-Puno), Cusco Region and Puno Region
 Chiarjaque, Tacna Region